Danie Gerhardus Krige (26 August 1919 – 3 March 2013) was a South African statistician and mining engineer who pioneered the field of geostatistics and was professor at the University of the Witwatersrand, Republic of South Africa. The technique of kriging is named after him. Krige's empirical work to evaluate mineral resources was formalised in the 1960s by French engineer Georges Matheron.

References

External links
Obituary in Canadian Mining Journal
Keynote: Address: A tribute to Prof. D.G. Krige for his contributions over a period of more than half a century

South African statisticians
South African geologists
South African mining engineers
1919 births
2013 deaths
20th-century South African engineers
University of the Witwatersrand alumni
Academic staff of the University of the Witwatersrand
People from Nala Local Municipality
Geostatistics